Rainlendar is a calendar program for Windows, Mac OS X and Linux. Versions prior to version 2 are licensed under the GNU GPL as free software, but subsequent versions are proprietary shareware.

Rainlendar is characterized by very small space and memory requirements, stability, and an easily customizable user-interface (using skins). The calendar can be transparently placed on the desktop and can be managed using the Windows notification area. It has common functions such as task list and a reminder alarm. Different event types can be represented with different symbols. Calendars can also be imported or synchronized using common file formats such as Outlook, iCal and iCalendar files (using a plugin).

In addition to the stand-alone calendar program, a Rainlendar-server is available for Windows and Linux, which can synchronize distributed Rainlendar applications. The program can also be used as a LiteStep plugin.

Rainlendar is available as of 2016 in about 60 languages (via language packs), and thousands of individual skin designs.

Alternatives to Rainlendar include Korganizer, the GNOME calendar (both for Linux) and Lightning.

External links
 Last free software version
 Official Website

Skin archives 
 customize.org
 Skinbase
 WinCustomize

Calendaring software
Cross-platform software
Formerly free software
Software that uses wxWidgets